Euphaedra demeter, the Demeter Ceres forester, is a butterfly in the family Nymphalidae. It is found in Nigeria, Cameroon and the Republic of the Congo. The habitat consists of forests.

References

Butterflies described in 1983
demeter